The Harry P. Leu Gardens are semi-tropical and tropical gardens in Orlando, Florida, United States. They are open to the public. The address is 1920 North Forest Avenue Orlando, FL 32803.

A  section of the park, known as the Mizell-Leu House Historic District (or Leu Botanical Gardens and Leu House Museum), was designated a historic district on December 29, 1994. According to the National Register of Historic Places, it contains 3 historic buildings.

Site
The land on which the gardens were developed consists mostly of excessively drained, rapidly to very rapidly permeable sand which, in its natural state, has several inches of dark gray topsoil over about 5 feet of yellow subsoil (Candler soil series). Human alteration of the soil has resulted in 40% of the Gardens being classified as Urban Land, not assigned to an official soil series. Naturally moist soils are occasionally found.

History
The Leus traveled all over the world and brought back many exotic plants and many varieties (240) of camellias for their gardens. In 1961, the Leus deeded the house and the gardens to the city of Orlando.

Leu House Museum
At the heart of the gardens is Harry and Mary Jane Leu's home, known as the Leu House Museum, which has been restored and is on the National Historical Register.  Guided tours of the Leu House, illustrating turn-of-the century Florida living, are available on the hour and the half-hour (times subject to change).

Flora
Leu Gardens is located in USDA climate zone 9b. The mild subtropical climate allows for a mix of temperate and tropical plants. The gardens are known for their extensive collections of aroids, azaleas, bamboo, bananas, bromeliads, camellias, citrus, conifers, crepe myrtles, cycads, ferns, flowering shrubs, flowering trees, gingers, heliconias, hibiscus and mallows, magnolias, ornamental grasses, palms, perennials, roses, trees, and vines.

Areas of the gardens

Annual Garden: This area displays more than 7,000 annuals, perennials, and shrubs suited to the Central Florida growing season. Plants in this area are often changed every 4 months.

Archive Building:  Built in 2000, this building holds archive storage for the Leu House Museum, has a bride's room, a groom's room, public restrooms and storage closets.

Arid Garden: This area displays a wide variety of plants that are drought tolerant.  Many come from desert regions or areas that are seasonally dry.  Some types of plants found here include acacias, agaves, aloes, bromeliads, cacti, flowering trees, palms, succulents, and yuccas.

Aroid Collection: Aroids are a large group of plants that belong to the Araceae Family.  This diverse family shares a similar distinctive inflorescence (flowering structure), a spadix surrounded by a spathe.  A vast majority of aroids are tropical or subtropical, but a few are from temperate regions.  Most aroids at Leu Gardens can be found in the Tropical Stream Garden. Some of the plants include Aglaonema, Amorphophallus, Anthurium, Alocasia, Caladium, Colocasia, Dieffenbachia, Monstera, Philodendron, Spathiphyllum, Syngonium and Xanthosoma.

Azalea Collection: Approximately 50 different cultivars and species of azaleas are found mainly in the North and South Woods.  These are evergreen shrubs that belong to the genus Rhododendron. Azaleas begin flowering in late winter (Jan./Feb.) and are at their peak usually towards the end of February into early March.

Bamboo Collection: Nearly 50 different species and varieties of this woody-stemmed grass are displayed.

Banana Collection: Bananas belong to the Musaceae Family.  There are many cultivars and varieties that bear the familiar edible fruit, but there are other species that are grown for the colorful flowers or striking foliage.

Bromeliad Collection: Bromeliads are a large diverse group of plants that belong to the Bromeliaceae Family.  Many have brilliant colored inflorescences while others have strikingly colored foliage.  Some bromeliads are terrestrial (grow in the ground) while many others are epiphytic (grow on trees).  Bromeliads can be found throughout the Garden.

Butterfly Garden: This garden contains a wide variety of annuals, perennials, shrubs and trees that are attractive to butterflies and moths. Some of the plants are nectar plants; others are larval plants that larvae feed on. In addition, some of these plants also attract hummingbirds.

Camellia Collection: This is the most important collection of plants at Leu Gardens.  The foundation of this collection are the cultivars of Camellia japonica and Camellia sasanqua originally planted by Mr. Leu and his workers.  Today, over 2,000 plants and 230+ cultivars are displayed throughout the gardens, including displays of Camellia sinensis, which is the Tea Camellia, and other Camellia species.  This collection ranks among the largest in the United States and is one of the largest documented collections in the southeast.

Cemetery: The Mizell Cemetery contains 36 marked and unmarked graves of family members including David and Angeline Mizell, the original owners of the land that is now Harry P. Leu Gardens.  There are tombstones that are dated to the 1860s.

Citrus Grove: Citrus is an important part of the history of Central Florida and to the former residents who lived on the property now occupied by Leu Gardens. The Grove contains over 50 different species, cultivars, and hybrids of citrus trees.

Citrus Statue: This statue is an honorarium to all citrus workers, a dying breed of laborer in this area.  It was approved for purchase by the Public Art Advisory Board in June 1990, and Mr. William Ludwig of Albany, Louisiana was commissioned to cast the figures of silicon bronze, a medium which lends itself to great detail.  The statue was originally installed and dedicated in 1992, and can be found in the center of  the Garden among the citrus trees in that area.

Conifer Collection: Conifers are a group of shrubs or trees that are gymnosperms that bear cones, although there are a few conifers that bear a fleshy, fruit-like structure.  Conifers can be found throughout the Gardens and include the dawn redwood and many different kinds of pine, cypress, junipers, podocarpus, araucarias and yew.
 
Cottage:  This building was originally a three-car garage built by Mr. Woodward and is currently used for meetings and classes.

Crepe Myrtle Collection:  Crepe myrtles are among the most commonly seen flowering shrubs and trees in Central Florida and belong to the genus Lagerstroemia.  Crepe Myrtles can be found throughout the Garden and include several dozen cultivars, hybrids, and  species.

Curator's Office:  This building was originally the home of one of the resident servants and is now the office of the Leu House Curator.

Cycad Collection: The Cycad collection displays over 50 species for Central Florida.  Cycads are primitive plants that have existed for nearly 200 million years.  They were the dominant plant life in the Cretaceous Period when dinosaurs ruled the Earth.  They are palm-like in appearance, but have no relation to palms.  They are instead cone-bearing gymnosperms that are most closely related to ferns, conifers and ginkgo.

Daylily Collection: Over 200 different cultivars of Hemerocallis can be found in the daylily collection.   The daylilies bloom from late spring into mid summer with a wide variety of colors and forms.
 
"Doves of Peace" Statue: This garden art statue by Bob Winship is located near the entrance to the White Garden.

Fern Collection: Ferns are ancient plants that reproduce by spores. Most ferns prefer a shaded location. Ferns can be found throughout the Gardens.

Floral Clock: Donated by the Kiwanis Club of Orlando, this 50-foot clock, located at the far west side of the Gardens, was imported from Scotland in 1966.

Flowering Tree Collection: Many different flowering trees can be found throughout Leu Gardens with specimens in bloom every month of the year.  With our Central Florida climate, both temperate and tropical species grow here.

Garden House: This  building, which opened in 1995, is the entrance to the Gardens.  It contains classrooms, event and exhibition spaces, a  botanical library, and the Garden Gift Shop.  It is home to the Garden House Gallery where permanent art collections are on display including the eight paintings by Mulford B. Foster.

Ginger and Heliconia Collections: These two collections are found mainly in the Tropical Stream Garden. The Ginger Collection contains plants in the Zingiberaceae Family.  It is a diverse group with plants having colorful flowers or foliage.  Heliconias are members of the Heliconiaceae Family.  They have banana-like foliage and bear spectacular inflorescences that are brilliantly colored and tropical.

Herb Garden: Displays of culinary, medicinal, ornamental, educational, historic, and aromatic herbs, some of which are also butterfly attractants, make up this garden.  Reminiscent of kitchen gardens from the turn of the century, herbs appropriate for the Central Florida landscape are demonstrated near the Cottage.  It, along with the Vegetable Garden, makes up the Kitchen Garden and may change with the seasons.

Hibiscus and Mallow Collection: This is a collection of a wide variety of commercial, edible and ornamental members of the Malvaceae Family.  This large and important family includes the tropical Hibiscus rosa-sinensis, rose-of sharon, abutilon, mallow, okra, cotton, cocoa tree, floss silk tree, baobab tree, kapok tree, pink ball tree, shaving brush tree and other showy plants. These are found throughout the Garden.

Home Demonstration Garden: Since its opening in 2003 this  space has been devoted to educational displays including noteworthy plants and architectural techniques and materials suitable for Central Florida gardeners. It is divided into 10 residentially scaled "idea gardens" showcasing different plant groups that include the following gardens: Bird, Bog, Enabling, Evening, Fragrance, Ornamental Grass, Shade, Subtropical Fruit, Urban Patio and Wildflower. 
•	The Bird Garden displays plants that attract and sustain birds in Central Florida.  Some of the plants produce fruit and berries for birds to eat while other plants have dense growth habits that allow birds cover or nesting sites.  There are also flowering plants that hummingbirds feed from and find attractive.  
•	The Bog Garden demonstrates plants that can tolerate growing in a wet location in the landscape. This is an area in which water can stand for several hours to a couple of days at a time following a heavy rainfall but is not permanent. The soil is very heavy and poorly drained. A "dry" streambed runs through the center of the Bog Garden but does not have a permanent flow of water.
•	The Enabling Garden was specifically designed to support Leu Garden's extensive horticultural therapy program.  The beds are raised for gardening for several purposes;  to provide accessibility for someone in a wheelchair, for someone who needs to remain seated most of the time or for people with visual impairments, because the plants are in closer range than on the ground.  The plantings in these beds may change throughout the year. In addition there is a small Texture Garden that contains plants with unusual textures to the touch or brightly colored foliage and flowers and a small Scented Garden with plants that have fragrant flowers or leaves or flowers. •	The Evening Garden displays a wide variety of plants that have foliage or flowers that  are easily seen in the evening or bear flowers that are fragrant at night.  Many of these plants have white flowers or variegated foliage
•	The Fragrance Garden contains plants that bear fragrant flowers or have  leaves or even  fruit that is fragrant. 
•	The Ornamental Grass Garden contains grasses or grass-like plants in a variety of heights short and tall. Most are grown for the ornamental foliage while others bear striking inflorescences.
•	The Shade Garden demonstrates different plant specimens that can grow in shady and low light locations of a landscape.
•	The Subtropical Fruit Garden contains different subtropical and tropical fruit trees and plants that can be grown in Central Florida
•	The Urban Patio Garden is ideally suited to smaller urban spaces.  It can help gardeners learn how to bring shape, form and color to a small area.  
•	The Wildflower Garden demonstrates wildflower specimens that are excellent choices for the low maintenance home landscape. Many are drought tolerant and pest resistant. They offer color almost year-round and are good for attracting butterflies, beneficial insects like bees, and sometimes hummingbirds. Most of the wildflowers displayed here are native to Central Florida, with some being annuals and some perennials. There are also native grasses, shrubs, and trees planted in this area.

Kitchen Garden:  The Kitchen Garden can be found beside and around the Cottage and Curator's Office and includes both the Herb Garden and Vegetable Garden.

Magnolia Collection: The Magnolia collection contains members of the Magnoliaceae Family. These include many cultivars of the Southern Magnolia, Magnolia grandiflora, Liriodendron, and other temperate and tropical species of Magnolia. Many of these formerly belonged to such genera as Manglietia, Michelia, Parakmeria, and Talauma. Many of the trees in this collection bear very fragrant flowers.

Native Wetland Garden: This garden was created to invite wading birds and other wildlife into the area.  The plants here are almost all entirely native.  They help filter pollutants from the water and protect the shoreline from erosion. They also provide food, habitat, and shelter for birds, fish, and other wildlife.

Ornamental Grass Collection:  Grasses are one of the largest families of monocots.  Many types make handsome ornamentals for the landscape.  Ornamental grasses can be found throughout the Garden.

Overstory Canopy: This canopy of mature trees is one of the most important aspects of Leu Gardens.  Without the shade from these trees, the camellias, azaleas, and other shade-loving plants would not be able to survive.

Palm Garden: This garden displays nearly 400 species of cold hardy and semi-tender palms suited for the central Florida climate.    This collection ranks among the most extensive collections in the United States.  Besides the palms, this garden contains the cycad collection, bamboo collection, and pandan collection. Planted amongst the cycads are other prehistoric plants such as conifers, ferns, horsetails, and tree ferns.

Perennial Garden: Many temperate and tropical perennials are grown and evaluated. Many bear show flowers, others have attractive foliage.

Rose Garden: Mary Jane's Rose Garden is named after Mrs. Leu, whose favorite flower was the rose.  She planted her first roses by the lake, and in 1944 a small rose garden was developed on the site where the current garden is located.  Over 215 varieties and 650 roses are displayed in this garden.  All are suited for Central Florida growing conditions.

Subtropical and Tropical Fruit Collection: Different subtropical and tropical fruit trees are found within this collection, including such specimens as acerola, avocado, guava, jaboticaba, jackfruit, loquat, lychee, macadamia mango, pineapple, and starfruit .

Tropical Stream Garden: This garden creates the atmosphere of a tropical rainforest with a gurgling stream that winds its way through the plantings and into Lake Rowena.  Many tropical and subtropical plants suitable for Central Florida are displayed here including aroids, bananas, bird-of-paradise, traveler's tree, bromeliads, calatheas, tropical conifers, crotons, gingers, heliconias, palms, ti plants, ferns, tree ferns, flowering trees, banyan tree, vines, and others.

Vegetable Garden:  This is a new area of the Garden which will contain both vegetables that were grown in the 1800s and varieties suitable for today's gardener.

Vine Displays: Nearly every plant family has members with a vining or climbing habit.  There are vining herbs, orchids, aroids, and even vining palms.  A majority of the vines grown throughout the world are found in tropical or subtropical climates. The vine displays are grown on the chain link fence that borders the overflow parking lot, and can also be found along the fences in the Home Demonstration Garden and along the Tropical Stream Garden.  The total display contains over 150 different vines, many with showy flowers, suitable for Central Florida.

White Garden: A small tranquil garden developed to give an alternative site for small weddings. The plants in this area have flowers that are white or have green and variegated foliage.

Wyckoff Overlook: The boardwalk and gazebo on Lake Rowena are named for John Wyckoff, one of the Garden's original board members.  The lakeshore area now contains an aquatic wetland garden, with the plants being almost entirely native.  Watch for birds and wildlife-but do not feed the alligators!!

See also 
 List of botanical gardens in the United States

References

External links

 Official site
 Leu Gardens at Central Florida Heritage Foundation
 Harry P. Leu Gardens, Leu House Museum, Orlando, Florida at MuseumsUSA.org

Botanical gardens in Florida
Buildings and structures in Orlando, Florida
National Register of Historic Places in Orange County, Florida
Historic districts on the National Register of Historic Places in Florida
Museums in Orlando, Florida
Historic house museums in Florida
Protected areas of Orange County, Florida
Houses in Orange County, Florida